Asad Ahmed (born 21 July 1971 in Karachi) is a Pakistani guitarist. His first stint was forming The Barbarians (Pakistani Rock Band). He has been a member of the famous pop trio Awaz, has played with Junoon, Vital Signs and was a founding member of the rock band Karavan. Asad is considered as the founder of Rock Music in Pakistan. He is currently a Solo Artist.

Early life 
His family moved to Dubai when he was quite young. His elder brother was a guitarist and when he left for college, he left his guitar back at home. Asad picked it up and quickly learnt to play. His family returned to Karachi in 1984.

Music career

Coke Studio 
Asad played in Coke Studio (Produced by Rohail Hyatt) and was one of the house band members from season 2 to season 6 and reappeared in season 13.

The Barbarians 
Asad started his music career in 1987 with The Barbarians, which is regarded by many as Pakistan's first rock band. The band's first single "Yeh Zindagi Hai" (This is Life) set the foundation of Pakistani rock. They got their first big break when The Barbarians participated in "Rock vs. Rock" show at the Taj Mahal (Agrah, India) and won a prize of 20,000 Rupees.
They released their only album, the self-titled "The Barbarians" in 1989, which did not fare well in the then rock-repellant Pakistani music industry. The Barbarians fell apart in 1990.

Junoon and Vital Signs 
Asad did a gig with Salman Ahmad of Junoon at a party in 1991. On Salman's invitation, he hopped on board with Junoon and played bass with them for about a year.
In a performance at Marriott Islamabad in November 1992, he met Haroon and Faakhir of Awaz and Rohail Hyatt of Vital Signs. This led to his performances on Vital Signs' Aitebar and Hum Tum .

Awaz 
Awaz was formed in December 1992, by Haroon, Faakhir and Asad. The band went on to become the next best thing in Pakistani pop scene after Vital Signs.
Awaz were highly skilled and talented musicians, producers and composers.  The band's skill at composing and producing was often overlooked and the focus was on their good looks, glossy videos, catch songs and wild stage performances.
Awaz was the first band from Pakistan to appear on MTV on 20 April 1992 with the song Janeman. Awaz released three albums. The first album was the self-titled album Awaz, more commonly known as Awaz 1. The second album was Jadu Ka Chiraagh and the third and last album was Shola.
After Shola, the band fell apart due to the differences among the three and they went their ways. Haroon and Faakhir started their solo careers. Awaz has sold over 3 million albums worldwide.

Karavan 
In 1997, foreseeing a disintegrating Awaz, Asad established his own studio. Simultaneously, he joined hands with Sameer Ahmed to form Karavan, thus returning to his rock origins. They brought the already established solo singer Najam Sheraz as the first vocalist and Alan Smith as drummer to complete the line-up. In 1999, Najam Shiraz returned to his solo career, vacating the vocalist's slot for newcomer Tanseer Daar. Karavan released Rakh Aas in 1997, Safar in 1999 and Gardish in 2002. In 2005, The band issued an internet only Unplugged album which had over 100,000 downloads. Karavan released their fourth and final studio album, Saara Jahan in 2010. The band broke up in 2012. Karavan has sold over 800,000 albums.

Solo 
Over the years, Asad has done extensive session work contributing his guitar work and compositions to albums by Vital Signs, Ali Zafar, Haroon, Sajjad Ali and Rahat Fateh Ali Khan to name a few. In 2017 he released Rebirth his first solo album which is also Pakistan's first all guitar instrumental album. Animal was released as the first single and got heavy airplay on radio and TV. On 14 August he also released a guitar rendition of the Pakistani National Anthem. Rebirth the title track was released as the second single and video on 18 December. Will You was released as the third and final single on 4 July 2018. Rebirth has had 500,000 downloads and streams on iTunes, Spotify, Deezer, Amazon Music and over 800 online platforms. This makes it the largest selling guitar instrumental album in South East Asia.

Asad released his second solo album Severe Cuts  in July 2020. The first single, "Dream of Right Now"   was sent to Radio on 14 July.

Discography 
 The Barabarians (EMI 1990)
 Nusrat Hussain – Amrit (EMI 1992)
 Awaz – Awaz (EMI 1993)
 Vital Signs – Aitebar (EMI 1993)
 Awaz – Jadu Ka Chiraagh (LIPS 1995)
 Vital Signs – Hum Tum (VCI 1995)
 Awaz – Shola (BMG/Crescendo 1996)
 Karavan – Rakh Aas (VCI 1997)
 Najam Sheraz – Roop nagar (LIPS 1999)
 Pepsi World Cup Album (VCI 1999)
 Karavan – Safar (Eagle Records 2000)
 Haroon – Haroon Ki Awaz (BMN 2000)
 Karavan – Gardish (DJ Gold 2002)
 Sajjad Ali – Teri Yaad (SOUNDMASTER 2002)
 Rahat Fateh Ali Khan – Paap (2003)
 Haroon – Lagan (BMN 2003)
 Karavan – Unplugged and unreleased (Internet only release 2005)
 Haroon – Haroon Ka Nasha (The Muzik Records 2007)
 Rahat Fateh Ali Khan  Charkha (Sa Re Ga Ma 2008)
 Karavan – Saara Jahan (The Musik records 2010)
 Rebirth – First solo instrumental album (Released by EMI Pakistan Ltd. 2017)
 Asad Ahmed – Severe Cuts (2020) 
Asad Ahmed – Ascension (2020)

References 

1971 births
Awaz members
Living people
Pakistani guitarists
Pakistani pop singers
People from Dubai
Pakistani expatriates in the United Arab Emirates
Musicians from Karachi
Pakistani heavy metal guitarists